Carpathonesticus orolesi  is an araneomorph spider species of the family Nesticidae named after the Dacian king Oroles. It occurs in the Romanian Carpathians.

Original publication

References 

Nesticidae
Spiders described in 2013
Spiders of Europe